John George "Big Jack" McGill (September 19, 1921 – January 13, 1994) was a Canadian professional ice hockey player. He played with the Boston Bruins of the National Hockey League between 1942 and 1947. The rest of his career, which lasted from 1941 to 1954, was spent in various minor leagues.

Playing career
Born in Edmonton, Alberta, McGill registered 19 points in his first 13 games with the Boston Bruins of the National Hockey League. He spent parts of two more seasons with the Bruins, finishing the remainder of his career in the AHL and other minor leagues. In 97 regular season NHL games, McGill recorded 23 goals and 36 assists for 59 points.

Career statistics

Regular season and playoffs

References

External links
  

1921 births
1994 deaths
Boston Bruins players
Boston Olympics players
Buffalo Bisons (AHL) players
Canadian ice hockey centres
Edmonton Flyers (WHL) players
Hershey Bears players
Houston Huskies players
New Westminster Royals players
Providence Reds players
Ice hockey people from Edmonton
Canadian expatriate ice hockey players in the United States